Paul Gregory Shanahan (born December 11, 1947) is a former pitcher in Major League Baseball. He pitched in 11 games for the Los Angeles Dodgers during the 1973 and 1974 seasons. Shanahan never did pick up a victory in the major leagues but on the final day of the 1973 season, he did pick up his one and only MLB save. It came against the Padres and Shanahan pitched 4 very effective innings, allowing only 1 run on 2 hits and nailing down a 3-2 victory. He saved the game for starting pitcher Geoff Zahn and helped the Dodgers win their 95th game of the season.

References

External links

1947 births
Living people
Albuquerque Dukes players
American expatriate baseball players in Mexico
Bakersfield Dodgers players
Baseball players from California
Diablos Rojos del México players
El Paso Dodgers players
Humboldt State Lumberjacks baseball players
Los Angeles Dodgers players
Major League Baseball pitchers
Medford Dodgers players
Mexican League baseball pitchers
Omaha Royals players
Sportspeople from Eureka, California
UC Santa Barbara Gauchos baseball players
American expatriate baseball players in Venezuela